The siciliana  or siciliano  (also known as the sicilienne  or the ciciliano) is a musical style or genre often included as a movement within larger pieces of music starting in the Baroque period. It is in a slow  or  time with lilting rhythms, making it somewhat resemble a slow jig or tarantella, and is usually in a minor key.  It was used for arias in Baroque operas, and often appears as a movement in instrumental works. Loosely associated with Sicily, the siciliana evokes a pastoral mood, and is often characterized by dotted rhythms that can distinguish it within the broader musical genre of the pastorale.

History and notable examples
In a 2006 book, Raymond Monelle found musicologists' attempts to trace the style to any authentic tradition in Sicily inconclusive, though he did trace its origins back to Italian Renaissance madrigals from the 1500s, in triple time with dotted rhythms. These madrigal rhythms may themselves derive from the dactylic hexameter of the epic poetry of ancient Greece and Rome.

Baroque era

Monelle notes that the texts of Scarlatti's siciliana arias are generally lamenting and melancholic. Several written references to the genre are known from earlier in the 1600s; and sicilianas are described in musical dictionaries since 1703.

Further examples of Baroque sicilianas are found in J. S. Bach's music: for instance, in his Sonata in G minor for solo violin, BWV 1001, in his Sonata in E-flat for flute and harpsichord, BWV 1031, and in his Concerto in E for harpsichord and strings, BWV 1053. Other well-known Baroque sicilianas are: the middle movement of Antonio Vivaldi's Concerto Grosso, Op. 3, No. 11, from L'estro armonico (which Bach then transcribed as his Concerto in D minor for organ, BWV 596), the first movement of Giuseppe Tartini's "Devil's Trill Sonata" for violin, and the last movement of Arcangelo Corelli's Christmas Concerto, Op. 6, No. 8.

Classical era

Works in siciliana rhythm appear occasionally in the Classical period.  Joseph Haydn, perhaps inspired by the bucolic associations of the genre, wrote a siciliana aria for soprano in his oratorio The Creation, "Nun beut die Flur das frische Grün", to celebrate the creation of plants.  For Mozart, the hesitating rhythm of the siciliana lent itself to the portrayal of grief, and some of Mozart's most powerful musical utterances are tragic sicilianas: the aria for soprano "Ach, ich fühl's, es ist verschwunden" from The Magic Flute, the F-sharp minor slow movement of the Piano Concerto, K. 488, the F minor Adagio from the Piano Sonata, K. 280, and the finale of the String Quartet in D minor, K. 421. In a more cheerful A major, he used a siciliana as the opening theme of his Piano Sonata, K. 331.

Other examples of Classical sicilianas are the third movement of Domenico Cimarosa's Oboe Concerto, the last movement of Carl Maria von Weber's Violin Sonata No. 5, and the second movement of Anton Reicha's Clarinet Quintet in F major, Op. 107.

The guitar virtuoso Mauro Giuliani (1781–1829) was very fond of the siciliana style and frequently composed in it. A notable example is the second movement of his Guitar Concerto No. 1 in A major, Op. 30. Another siciliana written for guitar (with vocal) is Franz Xaver Gruber's renowned Christmas carol, "Silent Night".

Romantic era

At the beginning of the Romantic period, John Field inserted a refined siciliana ("Siciliano") in G minor in his Fourth Concerto for Piano and Orchestra (1814). Bernard Crussell used a "siciliano" as a slow part in one of his clarinet duets of 1820/21. Later in the Romantic era, Brahms wrote a siciliana as the 19th variation in his Variations and Fugue on a Theme by Handel for solo piano (1861). In another set of variations by Brahms, the orchestral Variations on a Theme by Haydn (1873), the seventh variation also takes the form of a siciliana. The second of Moritz Moszkowski's Trois Morceaux poétiques, Op. 42 (1887), is a "Siciliano".

Hélène's aria, "Merci, jeunes amies" ("Thank you, beloved friends") from Verdi's opera Les vêpres siciliennes is another example of a siciliana, suited to its setting, and is referred to as such in the score, even though it is popularly called a bolero. The opening aria of Mascagni's masterpiece Cavalleria rusticana is the Siciliana "O Lola".

Ernest Chausson composed a sicilienne as the second movement of his Concerto for Piano, Violin, and String Quartet, Op. 21 (1892). The orchestral suite from Pelléas et Mélisande by Gabriel Fauré includes his well-known Sicilienne, which he had composed for an incomplete project in 1893.

20th century

Examples of sicilianas in 20th-century music include Igor Stravinsky's Serenata from his ballet Pulcinella, Ottorino Respighi's Siciliana from "Ancient Airs and Dances", Suite No. 3, and Malcolm Arnold's Siciliano from the Little Suite No. 1 for Brass. Sergei Rachmaninoff utilized siciliana style and rhythms in three of his Op. 32 Preludes for piano: the B-flat minor (No. 2), the B minor (No. 10), and the B major (No. 11). Maurice Duruflé's Suite for Organ (Op. 5) contains a Sicilienne notable for its Impressionist harmonies, and another prominent example is the middle movement of Paul Hindemith's Organ Sonata No. 2.

Hungarian composer György Kurtág references the style in a surprising way in his 1987 magnum opus, Kafka-Fragmente Op. 24, for soprano and violin in the movement "Der wahre Weg" ("The true path"). Nino Rota's "Godfather Waltz" is a classic siciliana at the start of his Grammy-winning score for the 1972 film. Other examples of siciliana style in the 20th century include the "Intrada" and "Rhapsody" from Gerald Finzi's cantata Dies Natalis.

Notes

Baroque music
Dance forms in classical music
Music of Sicily